"Nineveh" is a song by New Zealand singer-songwriter Brooke Ligertwood. It was released as the first and only promotional single from her first live album, Seven (2022), on 4 February 2022. Brooke Ligertwood co-wrote the song with Steven Furtick. The single was produced by Brooke Ligertwood and Jason Ingram.

Background
"Nineveh" was released on 4 February 2022, accompanied with its live music video. "Nineveh" follows the release of "A Thousand Hallelujahs" which was the first single from her live album, Seven (2022). Ligertwood shared the story behind the song, saying that Steven Furtick reached out to her in the spring of 2021 with the idea of writing a song called "Nineveh." Ligertwood opined about the songwriting process for the song, saying:

Composition

Music videos
On 4 February 2022, Brooke Ligertwood released the live performance video of "Nineveh" via YouTube. The live performance video was recorded on 11 November 2021, at The Belonging Co, a church in Nashville, Tennessee. Ligertwood published the lyric video of the song via YouTube on 13 February 2022.

Personnel
Adapted from AllMusic.

 Jonathan Baines — vocals
 Lorenzo Baylor — vocals
 Natalie Brown — vocals
 Jonathan Buffum — engineer
 Cassie Campbell — bass
 Angelique Carter — vocals
 Tamar Chipp — vocals
 David Dennis — vocals
 Emily Douglas — vocals
 Jackson Dreyer — vocals
 Katelyn Drye — vocals
 E. Edwards — guitar
 Enaka Enyong — vocals
 David Funk — keyboards, programmer
 Sarah Gerald — vocals
 Sam Gibson — mixing
 Olivia Grasso — vocals
 Cecily Hennigan — vocals
 Jason Ingram — engineer, producer, programmer
 Nicole Johnson — vocals
 Benji Kurokose — vocals
 Shantrice Laura — vocals
 Drew Lavyne — mastering engineer
 Jenna Lee — vocals
 Jonathan Lee — guitar
 Brooke Ligertwood — guitar, keyboards, primary artist, producer, vocals
 Allison Marin — strings
 Antonio Marin — strings
 Daniella Mason — choir arrangement
 Daniel McMurray — drums
 Jonathan Mix — engineer
 Noah Moreno — vocals
 Brecken Myers — vocals
 Angela Nasby — vocals
 Jordyn Pierce — vocals
 Marci Pruzina — vocals
 Christine Rhee — vocals
 Emily Ruff — vocals
 Rylee Scott — vocals
 Zack Smith — vocals
 Cheryl Stark — vocals
 Keithon Stribling — vocals
 Dylan Thomas — guitar
 Bobby Valderrama — vocals
 Bria Valderrama — vocals
 Robby Valderrama — vocals
 John Wilds — vocals
 Mitch Wong — vocals
 Steph Wong — vocals

Charts

Release history

References

External links
 

2022 singles
2022 songs
Brooke Fraser songs
Songs written by Steven Furtick
Songs written by Brooke Fraser